This is a list of songs about the American city of Seattle.

References

Seattle
Culture of Seattle
 Seattle
Songs